Envoy Extraordinary may refer to:

 Envoy Extraordinary (novella) by William Golding
 Envoy Extraordinary and Minister Plenipotentiary, a diplomatic rank